A Tale of Love and Darkness is a 2015 drama film written and directed by Natalie Portman in her directorial feature debut. Based on the memoir of the same name by Israeli author Amos Oz, it takes place in Jerusalem in the last years of Mandatory Palestine and the first years of independent Israel. It stars Amir Tessler as Oz, and Gilad Kahana and Portman as his parents. It was screened at the 2015 Cannes Film Festival and in the Special Presentations section of the 2015 Toronto International Film Festival.

Plot
Amos (Yonatan Shiray) reflects on his early childhood in British Mandate of Palestine (now Israel) with his mother Fania (Natalie Portman) and father Arieh (Gilad Kahana). His parents are Ashkenazi Jews who have immigrated from Europe to Jerusalem. Amos's mother finds life difficult because Jerusalem is a desert, because her family lives in Tel Aviv, and because communication with them is difficult. Amos, an only child, is particularly close to his mother, who frequently tells him stories based on her childhood that often have unhappy or violent endings.

Amos's parents regularly lend him out to a childless couple they are friends with. On one occasion this couple take him to visit a friend of theirs, a Palestinian Arab. They warn Amos to be quiet and not make much fuss lest he offend their hosts, but while playing with a swing he accidentally injures the Arab's little son. Terrified, Amos's father calls the injured boy's father and promises to pay all of the hospital fees.

On November 29, 1947, Amos's family and others from the neighbourhood gather around a radio in the street to hear the passing of United Nations General Assembly Resolution 181, which adopted a plan to partition Mandatory Palestine into independent Arab and Jewish states. Amos's parents are overwhelmed with joy. His father tells him  how savagely his grandfather was treated by anti-Semites in Europe and how, now that the Jewish people have a country of their own, that anti-Semitism will disappear forever. Arieh tells Amos that while he may be bullied someday for being an intellectual, no one will ever mistreat him for being a Jew.

Soon afterward, civil war erupts between Arabs and Jews in Palestine. Amos's father enlists to fight in the war, while Amos and other children are recruited to gather bottles for 'cocktails' and bags for sand for the war effort. One of Fania's friends is killed by a Palestinian sniper while she is hanging up her family's laundry.

Although the war soon ends in defeat for the Arabs, Fania falls into major depression and becomes unable to sleep or eat. Amos and Arieh try their best to hide her depression from their friends and family. While taking anti-depressants, Fania abruptly becomes her former, more lively self and begins to act normally with her husband and son. During a meal at a restaurant, however, she relapses once more. Saying that he doesn't know how to help her, Arieh sends Fania to her sisters in Tel Aviv. Despite her sisters' efforts to lift her spirits, Fania commits suicide by a deliberate overdose in 1952. In voiceover, Amos expresses a belief that his mother felt so much pain that she had come to see death as a lover with whom she longed to unite herself.

Years  later, Amos goes to live on a kibbutz, where he works to fulfill his mother's dream of making the desert bloom. During a visit from his father, a teenaged Amos shows off his new life but admits that despite his attempts at being a strong and healthy farmer, he is still a pale and weak intellectual.

Decades later, an elderly Amos Oz sits down to write his memoirs, beginning with the word, "Mother".

Cast
 Natalie Portman as Fania Klausner née Mussman
 Gilad Kahana as Arieh Klausner
 Amir Tessler as Amos Klausner (child)
 Makram Khoury as Halawani
 Yonatan Shiray as Amos Klausner/Oz (teenager) 
 Shira Haas as Fania Mussman (young) / Kira
 Tomer Kapon as The Pioneer
 Neta Riskin a Haya

Production

According to Portman, she optioned the rights to the book over tea, while visiting with Oz and his wife. It took her eight years to write the script and find funding, during which time she insisted that the adaptation remain in Hebrew.

It is the second film in which Portman speaks Hebrew. In order to play the role of Amos Oz's mother, an immigrant from what is now Ukraine, Portman made considerable efforts to remove all traces of an American accent from her Hebrew.

Portman recruited designer Alber Elbaz to design the costumes she wore in the film.

In March 2016 Focus World acquired the rights to distribute a theatrical release of the film in the United States.

Reception
The film has received mixed reviews, with 71% out of 58 film critics on the online review website Rotten Tomatoes giving it a positive rating. The website's critical consensus reads, "A Tale of Love and Darkness suggests greater things for debuting writer-director Natalie Portman — even if its reach slightly exceeds her creative grasp." Critical aggregator website Metacritic awarded the film a score of 55, indicating "mixed or average reviews".

References

External links
 
 
 
 
 

2015 films
2015 directorial debut films
2015 drama films
American drama films
Amos Oz
2010s Arabic-language films
2010s Hebrew-language films
Israeli drama films
Films about Jews and Judaism
Films based on autobiographies
Films based on Israeli novels
Films directed by Natalie Portman
Films produced by Ram Bergman
Films scored by Nicholas Britell
Films set in the 1940s
Films set in the 1950s
Films set in Jerusalem
Films set in Mandatory Palestine
Films with screenplays by Natalie Portman
2010s Russian-language films
2010s English-language films
2015 multilingual films
American multilingual films
Israeli multilingual films
2010s American films